Anna Menconi (born 27 July 1971) is an Italian Paralympic archer.

Menconi competed at the Paralympic Games in 2000, where she won a gold medal in the Women's teams open event, and in 2004 where she won a silver medal in the Women's teams open event.

References

External links
 

1971 births
Living people
Italian female archers
Paralympic archers of Italy
Paralympic gold medalists for Italy
Paralympic silver medalists for Italy
Archers at the 2000 Summer Paralympics
Archers at the 2004 Summer Paralympics
Medalists at the 2000 Summer Paralympics
Medalists at the 2004 Summer Paralympics
Paralympic medalists in archery
21st-century Italian women